Dinero is a uniprocessor CPU cache simulator for memory reference traces written by Dr. Jan Edler and Prof. Mark D. Hill of the University of Wisconsin–Madison. It is frequently used for educational purposes.

How to

License & Installation
Dinero is freely available for non-commercial use.

See also 
 Central processing unit (CPU)
 CPU cache

References

External links
 Dinero IV official homepage (University of Wisconsin System)
 sample trace file (Hanyang University)

Cache (computing)
University of Wisconsin–Madison